Gyrineum cuspidatum is a species of predatory sea snail, a marine gastropod mollusc in the family Cymatiidae.

Description

References

Cymatiidae
Gastropods described in 1844